This is a list of notable events in music that took place in the year 1731.

Events
The Academy of Vocal Music changes its name to the Academy of Ancient Music.
Jean-Philippe Rameau meets his patron, La Pouplinière.
Antonio Stradivari makes a viola that will be owned a hundred years later by Niccolò Paganini.
Antonio Vivaldi returns to Venice.
March 23 Johann Sebastian Bach premieres his St Mark Passion BWV 247 (BC D 4) at St. Thomas Church, Leipzig.

Classical music
William Babell – Prelude in F major, IWB 10
Carl Phillip Emanuel Bach 
Keyboard Sonata in B-flat major, H. 2, Wq. 62/1
Trio Sonata in D minor, H. 569, Wq. 145 (formerly attributed to J.S. Bach as BWV 1036)
Trio Sonata in C major, H. 571, Wq. 147
Johann Sebastian Bach 
Wir danken dir, Gott, wir danken dir, BWV 29 
Der Herr ist mein getreuer Hirt, BWV 112 (premiered Apr. 8 in Leipzig)
Komm, Jesu, komm, BWV 229
Wachet auf, BWV 140 (premiered Nov. 25 in Leipzig)
Orchestral Suite No.3 in D major, BWV 1068
Jean Barrière – Sonatas for Pardessus de viole, Livre 5
Joseph Bodin de Boismortier 
6 Gentillesses en 3 parties, Op. 33
6 Sonates à quatre parties, Op. 34
6 Suites de pièces, Op.35
Louis de Caix d'Hervelois 
Collection of flute pieces
4 Suites de pièces pour la viole, Op. 3
 Antonio Caldara – David umiliato
Louis-Antoine Dornel – Pièces de clavecin
Christoph Graupner 
Trio Sonata in E minor, GWV 209
Flute Concerto in D major, GWV 312
Concerto for Flute d'amore, Oboe d'amore and Viola d'amore in G major, GWV 333
 George Frideric Handel – Minuet in G major, HWV 530
Michele Mascitti – 12 Violin Sonatas, Op. 8
Johann Joachim Quantz – 6 Flute Sonatas, RISM Q. 33
Giuseppe Tartini 
Pastorale in A major, B.A16
Violin Sonata in G major, B.G17
Violin Sonata in G minor, B.g10 "Didone abbandonata"
Georg Philipp Telemann 
Abscheuliche Tiefe des großen Verderbens, TWV 1:9
Der mit Sünden beleidigte Heiland, TWV 1:306
Nach Finsternis und Todesschatten, TWV 1:1150
Fortsetzung des Harmonischen Gottes-Dienstes
Jan Dismas Zelenka – Missa Sancti Josephi, ZWV 14

Opera
Tommaso Albinoni – Fano
Francesco Corradini – Con amor non hay libertad
Francesco Corselli – Venere placata
Carl Heinrich Graun – Iphigenia in Aulis
George Frideric Handel  
Poro, re dell'Indie, HWV 28
Rinaldo, HWV 7b (revised 1711 version)
Johann Adolf Hasse 
Cajo Fabricio
Cleofide
Giovanni Battista Pergolesi – La conversione e morte di San Guglielmo
Nicola Porpora – Poro
Antonio Vivaldi – Semiramide, RV 733

Theoretical publications
Johann Mattheson – Grosse General-Baß-Schule

Births
November 27 – Gaetano Pugnani, composer (died 1798)
December 8 – František Xaver Dušek, harpsichordist, pianist and composer (died 1799)
December 28 – Christian Cannabich, composer (died 1798)

Deaths
January 27 – Bartolomeo Cristofori, inventor of an early form of piano (born 1655)
May 1 (buried) – Johann Ludwig Bach, violinist and composer (born 1677)
July 5 (buried) – Jakob Greber, composer and musician (date of birth unknown)
November – Johann Caspar Wilcke, musician and father of Anna Magdalena Bach
December 26 – Antoine Houdar de la Motte, librettist (born 1672)

References

 
18th century in music
Music by year